Bagagem River may refer to three rivers in Brazil:

 Bagagem River (Goiás)
 Bagagem River (Minas Gerais)
 Bagagem River (Tocantins)